Coleophora honestella is a moth of the family Coleophoridae that can be found in Algeria, Libya and Morocco.

References

External links

honestella
Moths of Africa
Moths described in 1952